The 1979 National Camogie League is a competition in the women's team field sport of camogie was won by Dublin, who defeated Limerick in the final, played at Russell Park.

Arrangements
For the first time the league was divided into four, rather than two zones. Dublin defeated Derry, Wicklow and Antrim easily but were held to a draw by Cork in the semi-final, scoring 2-2 in the first ten minutes and leading 3-4 to 0-5 at half-time. They won the replay at Blanchardstown by 5-5 to 3-4 despite another brave second half rally by Cork. Limerick defeated the holders Kilkenny and Clare and then Down in the semi-final.

The Final
The final was the lowest scoring in the history of the League. Agnes Hourigan wrote in the Irish Press: Their busy programme over the past few months was an advantage for Dublin. They were sharper and faster to the ball and would have own by a bigger margin were it not for the superb defensive work of the Limerick side.

Final stages

References

External links
 Camogie Association

National Camogie League
1979